In Thailand are a growing number of Montessori schools and organizations. The first Montessori Schools since 1995 have been founded in Phuket by Willem van Benthum, founder of the Rawai Progressive International Montessori School in Phuket (1996), in Pattaya Naklua and by parents in Chiang Mai (Piti Suksa School in 1998). But the history of Alternative education in Thailand and the influence of Maria Montessori to several (mostly private schools) might date back to much earlier years.

Montessori Schools in Thailand

Directory of Montessori Schools in Thailand and Worldwide (incl. Thailand) 

 Montessori International Community
 Global Map of Montessori Schools (ongoing project). The location of Montessori Schools in Thailand can be zoomed in by moving the map to display Thailand only or even higher resolutions.

 Montessori College
 Community of Montessori Schools, Educational Institutions, and Educators Worldwide that provides a collection of accessible material, literature, and training resources with the goal to make an All-Inclusive Education for All aged 0-100+ possible worldwide for everyone no matter its wealth and social status.

 Montessori Thailand
 Montessori Schools, Educational Institutions and Educators and historical development of the Montessori Movement in Thailand

 Phuket@School
 Community of Schools and Educational Institutions in the Phuket and Andaman Region - including Montessori Schools, Initiatives and Organizations

Thai Public Montessori Schools (Thai and Montessori Curriculum) 
The school year for schools following the Thai curriculum starts in May and ends in March. April is considered Holiday. The half-term break is in October. Students finishing Elementary Grades (Pratom) 3, 6, Secondary Grades (Mathayom) 3, and 6 have to pass a Thai National Test (O-Net). In April 2004 the Pilot Project for The Development of the Child’s Potential in Small Government School using the Montessori Approach. The first AMI 3 to 6 Diploma Course in Thailand started in 2006 and a second course started in 2009, a third course in 2011 and some more followed.

Chiang Mai 

 Ban Chang Khoeng Samakee Wittayakhan School
 Chang Khaen, Mae Chaem, C. Chiang Mai
 Ban Muang Chum School
 T. Mae Taeng, A. Mae Taeng, C. Chiang Mai
 Ban Rong Khi Lek School
 T. Choeng Doi, A. Doi Saket, C. Chiang Mai

Chiang Rai 

 Ban Doi Hang School
 T. Doi Hang, A. Mueang Chiang Rai, C. Chiang Rai
 Ban Don School
 T. Don Sila, A. Wiang Chai, C. Chiang Rai
 Ban Huai Sai Khao School
 T. Mae Yao, A. Mueang Chiang Rai, C. Chiang Rai
 Ban Mae Mon Wittaya School
 T. Mueang Chiang Rai, A. Mueang Chiang Rai, C. Chiang Rai
 Ban Nong Bua Pha Bom School
 T. Pha Ngam, A. Wiang Chai, C. Chiang Rai
 Ban Pa Sang Nuea School
 T. Pa Sang, A. Wiang Chiang Rung, C. Chiang Rai
 Ban Pa Yang Mon School
 T. Rop Wiang, A. Mueang Chiang Rai, C. Chiang Rai
 Ban Pang Khon School
 T. Huai Chomphu, A. Mueang Chiang Rai, C. Chiang Rai
 Ban Pang Lao School
 T. Mae Khao Tom, A. Mueang Chiang Rai, C. Chiang Rai
 Ban Pang Rim Kok School
 T. Mae Kon, A. Mueang Chiang Rai, C. Chiang Rai
 Ban Wiang Doem School
 T. Wiang Nuea, A. Wiang Chai, C. Chiang Rai
 Hong Si Kindergarten
 C. Chiang Rai
 Pha Kwang Wittaya School
 T. Mae Yao, A. Mueang Chiang Rai, C. Chiang Rai
 Wiang Kaew Witthaya School
 T. Mueang Chum, A. Wiang Chai, C. Chiang Rai

Chumphon 

 Bunsombat Wittaya School
 T. Na Pho, A. Sawi, C. Chumphon
 Montessori Chumphon Ban Khao Thalom School
 T. Khao Thalom, A. Mueang Chumphon, C. Chumphon

Private Thai and Bilingual Schools (Thai Curriculum) 
The school year for schools following the Thai curriculum starts in May and ends in March. April is considered Holiday. The half-term break is in October. Students finishing Elementary Grades (Pratom) 3, 6, Secondary Grades (Mathayom) 3, and 6 have to pass a Thai National Test (O-Net).

Buri Ram 

 Buriram Montessori
 T. Nai Mueang, A. Mueang Buri Ram, C. Buri Ram

Chiang Mai 

 Baan Maerim Montessori
 A. Mae Rim, T. Chiang Mai

Chiang Rai 

 Anuban Nang Lae (Ban Thung)
 T. Nang Lae, A. Mueang Chiang Rai, C. Chiang Rai
 Anuban Wiang Chiang Rung
 T. Thung Ko, A. Wiang Chiang Rung, C. Chiang Rai
 Kasemsasna Montessori School
 T. Wiang Chai, A. Wiang Chai, C. Chiang Rai
 Nimitmai Trilingual Kindergarten
 T. Mae Sai, A. Mae Sai, C. Chiang Rai
 Piti Suksa School
 Mueang Chiang Rai, C. Chiang Rai
 Sunlight Montessori Chiangrai
 T. Doi Hang, A. Mueang Chiang Rai, C. Chiang Rai
 Wisanusorn School
 T. Rob Wiang, A. Mueang Chiang Rai, C. Chiang Rai

Chonburi 

 Wonder Years Montessori School
 Nong Kham, Si Racha, Chon Buri

Khon Kaen 

 CaSa De Bamboo Montessori School
 T. Ban Pet, A. Mueang Khon Kaen, C. Khon Kaen
 Suanson Khonkaen School
 A. Mueang Khon Kaen, C. Khon Kaen
 Unrak Khon Kaen School
 T. Nai Mueang, A. Mueang Khon Kaen, C. Khon Kaen

Krabi 

 Daisy Chains Krabi Montessori
 T. Ao Nang, A. Mueang Krabi, C. Krabi
 The Montessori Corner Krabi
 T. Pak Nam, A. Mueng-Krabi, C. Krabi

Krung Thep Maha Nakhon 

 Amnuay Silpa Dhonburi - Montessori School
 Bang Khae Nuea, Bang Khae, Krung Thep Maha Nakhon
 Amnuay Silpa School
 Thung Phaya Thai, Ratchathewi, Krung Thep Maha Nakhon
 Kornkaew Montessori School
 Dusit, Krung Thep Maha Nakhon
 Mahachai Christian Wittaya School
 T. Mahachai, A. Samut Sakhon, C. Krung Thep Maha Nakhon
 Montessori Play and Learn
 Prawet, C. Krung Thep Maha Nakhon
 Montessori Sukhumvit 71 School
 Khlong Tan Nuea, Watthana, Krung Thep Maha Nakhon
 Phramae Mary Sathon School
 Thung Wat Don, Sathon, Krung Thep Maha Nakhon
 Plearn Montessori Early Learning & Childcare
 Thawi Watthana, Ekachai, C. Krung Thep Maha Nakhon
 Pongsuwan Wittaya Sai Mai School
 T. Sai Mai, A. Sai Mai, C. Krung Thep Maha Nakhon
 Sombunwit Trilingual School
 Khwaeng Samae Dam, Chom Thong, Krung Thep Maha Nakhon
 Sunshine Montessori Nursery
 Khwaeng Saphan Sung, Saphan Sung, Krung Thep Maha Nakhon
 Yuwamit Kindergarten
 Wachira Phayaban, Dusit, Krung Thep Maha Nakhon

Loei 

 Loei Montessori School
 T. Nam Man, A. Mueang Loei, C. Loei

Nakhon Ratchasima 

 Korat Montessori
 Nai Mueang, C. Nakhon Ratchasima
 Mori Mori Montessori
 T. Ban Mai, A. Mueang Nakhon Ratchasima, C. Nakhon Ratchasima
 Will Montessori Korat
 T. Nai Mueang, A. Mueang Nakhon Ratchasima, C. Nakhon Ratchasima

Narathiwat 

 Narashire Montessori
 T. Bang Nak, A. Mueang Narathiwat, C. Narathiwat

Nong Khai 

 Sirakan Montessori School
 T. Khai Bok Wan, A. Mueang Nong Khai, C. Nong Khai

Nonthaburi 

 Discovery Years Montessori Int'l Learning
 T. Sano Loi, A. Bang Bua Thong, C. Nonthaburi

Pathum Thani 

 Sathitpathum Demonstration School
 T. Bang Khu Wat, A. Mueang Pathum Thani, C. Pathum Thani

Phang Nga 

 Christian Montessori Preschool
 T. Khuekkhak , A. Takua Pa , C. Phang Nga
 Yaowawit School
 T. Mao, A. Kapong, C. Phang Nga

Phatthalung 

 Pattalung Christian School
 T. Khuha Sawan, A. Mueang Phatthalung, C. Phatthalung

Phuket 

 Satit Rajabhat University School - Montessori
 T. Ratsada, A. Mueang Phuket, C. Phuket

Prachuap Khiri Khan 

 SmartKids Nursery Hua Hin
 A. Hua Hin, C. Prachuap Khiri Khan

Ratchaburi 

 Naree Wittaya School - St. Mary Convent
 T. Na Muang, A. Mueang Ratchaburi, C. Ratchaburi

Songkla 

 About Montessori
 A. Hat Yai, C. Songkla
 Srinagarinda Wittayanukroh School
 T. Khlong Sai, A. Na Thawi, C. Songkhla
 Wonder Valley
 T. Phatong, A. Hat Yai, C. Songkla

Surat Thani 

 Anuban Chuleekorn Montessori School
 T. Donsak, A. Mueang Surat Thani, C. Surat Thani
 Surat Montessori Preschool
 T. Thung Kong, A. Kanchanadit, C. Surat Thani

Trang 

 Trinity Montessori Bilingual School
 T. Khuan Khun Kalase, A. Sikao, C. Trang

Ubon Ratchathani 

 Panwarin Montessori
 T. Saen Suk, A. Warin Chamrap, C. Ubon Ratchathani
 Piamsook Montessori School
 A. Mueang Ubon Ratchathani, C. Ubon Ratchathani

Udon Thani 

 Udon Montessori
 T. Mu Mon, A. Mueang Udon Thani, C. Udon Thani
 Udon Sensory School
 C. Udon Thani

Yala 

 Montessori House​ of​ Sateng
 T. Sateng, A. Mueang Yala, C. Yala

Private International Schools (Thai International and Montessori Curriculum) 
The international school year for schools following the Thai international curriculum starts in August and ends in June. July is considered Holiday. The half-term break is in February. Students finishing Elementary Grades (Pratom) 3, 6, Secondary Grades (Mathayom) 3, and 6 have to pass a Thai National Test (O-Net).

Chonburi 

 Mooltripakdee International School
 B. Pattaya City, A. Chonburi, C. Chonburi

Chiang Mai 

 Chiang Mai Montessori International School
 T. Nong Kwai, A. Hang Dong, C. Chiang Mai
 Northern International Montessori School
 T. Suthep, A. Mueang Chiang Mai, T. Chiang Mai

Chumphon 

 Theodore International School
 T. Takded, A. Mueang Chumphon, C. Chumphon

Kalasin 

 Kalasin Montessori School
 T. Phon Thong, A. Mueang Kalasin, C. Kalasin

Khon Kaen 

 Ratchut School
 T. Hua Nong, A. Ban Phai, C. Khon Kaen

Krabi 

 International Kids Sunflower
 Saithai, Ao Nang, Krabi
 Krabi International Montessori Academy
 T. Ao Nang, A. Mueang Krabi, C. Krabi

Krung Thep Maha Nakhon 

 Baantonmai Trilingual Kindergarten
 Samsen Nok, Huai Khwang, Krung Thep Maha Nakhon
 Baanwadfun Kindergarten
 Phahonyothin Rd, Lat Phrao, Krung Thep Maha Nakhon
 Casa Bambino International Preschool
 T. Thung Wat Don, A. Sathon, C. Krung Thep Maha Nakhon
 Ekamai International School - Kindergarten
 Pridi Banomyong, Sukhumvit, C. Krung Thep Maha Nakhon
 Global Indian International School
 T. Bangkayaeng, A. Pathumthani, C. Krung Thep Maha Nakhon
 International Montessori Center
 Saphan Sung, C. Krung Thep Maha Nakhon
 International Montessori Preschool
 Min Buri, C. Krung Thep Maha Nakhon
 John Wyatt Montessori
 Chom Phon, Chatuchak, C. Krung Thep Maha Nakhon
 John Wyatt Montessori Adolescent Farm School
 Nongdon, C. Saraburi
 John Wyatt Montessori International School
 Chom Phon, Chatuchak, C. Krung Thep Maha Nakhon
 Modern Montessori International Pre-School
 Sukhumvit, A. Khlong Toei, C. Krung Thep Maha Nakhon
 Montessori Academy Bangkok Intl. School
 Bang Na, C. Krung Thep Maha Nakhon
 Prep International Kindergarten, Ladprao 88
 Phlabphla, Wang Thonglang, Krung Thep Maha Nakhon
 Prep International Kindergarten, Sutthisan
 Samsen Nok, Huai Khwang, Krung Thep Maha Nakhon

Mukdahan 

 Mukdahan Montessori School
 A. Mueang Mukdahan, C. Mukdahan

Phuket 

 Greenhouse Phuket Kindergarten
 T. Choeng Thale, A. Thalang, C. Phuket
 Lighthouse Academy - International School
 T. Rawai, A. Mueang Phuket, C. Phuket
 Lighthouse Chalong International Kindergarten
 T. Chalong, A. Mueang Phuket, C. Phuket
 Montessori House Phuket International School
 T. Chalong, A. Mueang Phuket, C. Phuket
 Ruamrudee International School (RIS)
 T. Chalong, A. Mueang Phuket, C. Phuket | Start 2022
 United World College Thailand - UWCT
 T. Thep Krasattri, A. Thalang, C. Phuket

Montessori Homeschool Centers, Groups, and Families (Official Registered Thai Homeschooling) 
The Thai homeschool year starts in January and ends in November. December is considered a holiday. A half-term break can be chosen freely. All Thai National Tests (O-Net) are optional for homeschoolers. Thai parents need to register their children to be legally able to homeschool their children with the provincial primary or secondary  Education office. In some provinces the secondary Education office is located in another province (i.e. Phuket Secondary students need to be registered in Phang Nga Secondary Education Office while Elementary students can be registered with the Phuket Primary Education Office). Additional they need a Homeschool "Leader" with at least Secondary Grade Final Exam (Mathayom 6). The Thai Government is supporting homeschool families financially per school-term. Foreigners can not lead a Homeschool while they are able to teach Homeschool students.

General 

 Montessori Homeschooling in Thailand
 Montessori Homeschooling - Discussion in English Language and in another Group in Thai Language

Chiang Mai 

 Kru Ying's Home School
 T. San Sai Noi, A. San Sai, C. Chiang Mai

Phuket 

 International Montessori Center and Tutoring (IMCT)
 T. Rawai, A. Mueang Phuket, C. Phuket
 Noah Blessing Home Orphanage House
 T. Wichit, A. Mueang Phuket, C. Phuket
 Phuket Homeschool Network
 Network for Homeschool Families in Phuket focussing on Alternative Education

Montessori Organizations and Groups 
(with their Headquarters located in Thailand)

 Institute of Applied Science in Lifestyle Medicine and Montessori Education (ASLM.ME)
 Phuket, Thailand
 Montessori Association Thailand (MAT) affiliated with AMI
 Non-Profit Organization to Advance Montessori Education in Thailand
 Montessori X (endorsed by the Montessori Family)
 All-Inclusive Montessori Education for All 0 - 100+. Lifelong Learning!
 Thailand Association of Montessori Schools (TAMS)
 T. Dusit, A. Nakhon, C. Krung Thep Maha Nakhon

Alumni's of already renamed/relocated or closed Montessori Schools 

 Montessori Children Center International Alumni
 T. Naklua, A. Pattaya, C. Chonburi | 1998 - 2011
 Rawai Progressive International Montessori School Alumni
 Rawai Progressive International Montessori School (RPIS) Alumni, Phuket/Thailand | 1998-2013
 Samui Montessori Alumni
 T. Chaweng Noi, A. Koh Samui, C. Surat Thani

Congress, Conferences, Regular Workshops and Trainings 

 International Montessori Congress
 Historical view of all International Montessori Congresses since 1929 an the IMC2023 Education for a New World - 12-15 July 2023 - Bangkok/Thailand

Montessori Guide Jobs in Thailand 

 Montessori Guides
 Trainings and Requirements for Montessori Teachers

See also

Education in Thailand
International Schools Association of Thailand
List of international schools
List of schools in Thailand

Montessori schools in Thailand
 
Lists of schools in Thailand
Thailand